Bernard Patry (born January 30, 1943) is a Canadian politician.  He was a Member of Parliament for the riding of Pierrefonds—Dollard from 1993 to 2011. Party was also the President of the Parliamentary Assembly of the Francophonie - l'Assemblée parlementaire de la Francophonie - as of 2003.

Born in Montreal, Quebec, Dr. Patry was a general practitioner and one of the founders of the Pierrefonds Medical Clinic.  He began his political career in 1968, at the age of 25, becoming a city councillor in L'Île-Bizard, Quebec and one year later, one of the youngest mayors in Quebec. He was re-elected mayor five times and led his city for 18 years.

Dr. Patry was first elected to Parliament in 1993 as a Liberal candidate in the riding of Pierrefonds—Dollard, a post he held until 2011, when he lost re-election to NDP candidate Lysane Blanchette-Lamothe.  During his time in Parliament, he notably served as Parliamentary Secretary to the Minister of Indian Affairs and Northern Development from 1996 to 1998.   He was also the Chair of Standing Committee on Foreign Affairs and International Trade from 2002 to 2006.

International honours
In March 1998, he was awarded the title of "Chevalier" and in March 2003, the title of "Commandeur" of the Ordre de la Pléiade, which seeks to promote dialogue between francophone cultures.

List of parliamentary committees
Shortly after his arrival on Parliament Hill in 1993, Dr. Patry was active on a number of committees, including, inter alia:
 The Sub-Committee on HIV-AIDS
 The Standing Committee on Industry
 The Standing Committee on Aboriginal and Northern Affairs
 The Standing Committee on Health
 The Subcommittee on Agenda and Procedure of the Standing Committee on Foreign Affairs and International Trade

Other political activity
Dr. Patry further served as Vice-Chair of the Prime Minister's Task Force on Urban Affairs in 2001.
Prior to this, he had chaired the Quebec Liberal Caucus of the Liberal Party of Canada from 1995-1996.

Personal life
Dr. Patry is married to Françoise Haxaire. He has two sons and two granddaughters.

Electoral record

					
Note: Conservative vote is compared to the total of the Canadian Alliance vote and Progressive Conservative vote in 2000 election.
							

Note: Canadian Alliance vote is compared to the Reform vote in 1997 election.

References

External links
 

1943 births
Liberal Party of Canada MPs
Living people
Mayors of places in Quebec
Members of the House of Commons of Canada from Quebec
Politicians from Montreal
21st-century Canadian politicians